The 1900 Vermont gubernatorial election took place on September 4, 1900. Incumbent Republican Edward C. Smith, per the "Mountain Rule", did not run for re-election to a second term as Governor of Vermont. Republican candidate William W. Stickney defeated Democratic candidate John H. Senter to succeed him.

Results

References

Vermont
1900
Gubernatorial
September 1900 events